Marti Anderson (born 1951) is an American politician. A Democrat, she has served in as the representative from the 36th District in the Iowa House of Representatives since 2013.

Early life 
Anderson was born in 1951 in Des Moines, Iowa. She attended St. Joseph Academy and she has a bachelors of arts degree in social work from the University of Northern Iowa and a M.S.W. from the University of Iowa.

Political career 
During her first term, Anderson served on several committees in the Iowa House – the Environmental Protection, Human Resources, Judiciary, and Public Safety committees. She also served as a member of the Justice System Appropriations Subcommittee.

Electoral history
*incumbent

References

External links

 Representative Marti Anderson official Iowa General Assembly site
 Marti Anderson campaign site
 Financial information (state office) at the National Institute for Money in State Politics

1951 births
Living people
University of Northern Iowa alumni
University of Iowa alumni
Democratic Party members of the Iowa House of Representatives
Women state legislators in Iowa
Politicians from Des Moines, Iowa
21st-century American politicians
21st-century American women politicians